Abū Ḥātim al-Muẓaffar al-Isfazārī (fl. late 11th or early 12th century) was an Islamic mathematician, astronomer and engineer from Khurasan. According to the historian and geographer Ibn al-Athir and the polymath Qutb al-Din al-Shirazi, he worked in the Seljuq observatory of Isfahan. The Persian writer Nezami Aruzi met him in Balkh in (in present‐day Afghanistan) in 1112 or 1113.

Al-Isfazārī was a contemporary of the Persian polymath Umar al-Khayyam and the Persian astronomer Al-Khazini. Al-Isfazārī's main work,  (Guiding the Possessors of Learning in the Art of the Steelyard), sets out the theory of the steelyard balance with unequal arms. His other surviving works include a summary of Euclid's Elements, a text on geometrical measurements, and a treatise in Persian on meteorology.

References

Sources

Further reading
 

11th-century Iranian astronomers
Astronomers of the medieval Islamic world
12th-century Iranian astronomers
12th-century Iranian mathematicians
Year of birth missing
Scientists from Isfahan
People from Khorasan
Scholars from the Seljuk Empire